Epacris stuartii is a species of flowering plant in the heath family Ericaceae and is endemic to Tasmania. It was first formally described in 1910 by Otto Stapf and the description was published in the Bulletin of Miscellaneous Information.

References

stuartii
Ericales of Australia
Flora of Tasmania
Plants described in 1910
Taxa named by Otto Stapf